Geluwe (Hilwe in West Flemish) is a town in the West Flemish province of Belgium. It is contained within the municipality of Wervik. The town is known for the "yawning festival" (Dutch: gapersfeesten). The name Geluwe comes from the word gilwe, old West Flemish for yellow, because the soil is more yellow than the rest of the region.

Geography
The town counts 6,668 habitats and an area of 21.09 km² (8.14 sq mi). The neighboring towns and cities are:
 Beselare (municipality Zonnebeke)
 Dadizele (municipality Moorslede)
 Moorsele (municipality Wevelgem)
 Menen
 Wervik (mayor municipality)
 Kruiseke (municipality Wervik)

Through the town the stream Reutelbeek flows.

Transport
Geluwe is accessible by bus line 84 of the public transport company De Lijn. This bus line also stops in Ypres, Menin, Rekkem and Mouscron.

There's also an exit of the A19 (motorway) for cars. This makes transportation to Ypres and Courtrai quick and easy.

The N8 road is an road that makes it possible to go to Ypres and Menin. There's a bicycle path besides it.

Populated places in West Flanders